The 2013 Great West Conference baseball tournament was held from May 21 through 25.  All eight of the league's teams met in the double-elimination tournament held at new Jersey Institute of Technology's Bears & Eagles Riverfront Stadium in Newark, New Jersey.  As the Great West is a new conference, the league does not have an automatic bid to the 2013 NCAA Division I baseball tournament.  Third seeded  won their first championship, ending Utah Valley's run of three consecutive titles dating to the event's inception.

Seeding and format
All eight teams were seeded based on conference winning percentage only and then met in a double-elimination bracket.

Results

All-Tournament Team
The following players were named to the All-Tournament team.

Most Valuable Player
Luke Clements was named Tournament Most Valuable Player.  Clements was an outfielder for Houston Baptist.

References

Great West Conference baseball tournament
Tournament
Great West Conference baseball tournament
Baseball in New Jersey
College sports in New Jersey
Sports in Newark, New Jersey